John Stubbes was Archdeacon of Barnstaple from 1475 to 1476.

References

Archdeacons of Barnstaple
15th-century English people